The 2003–2004 FINA Swimming World Cup was a series of eight, short course meets organized by FINA and held at eight different international locations. The meets were held from November 2003 through February 2004.

Ed Moses of the United States and Martina Moravcová of Slovakia were the overall male and female winners of the series.

Meets

Event winners
Times listed at top of each table represent the series record (WC) as of the start of the 2003/2004 World Cup.

50 Freestyle

100 Freestyle

200 Freestyle

400 Freestyle

1500/800 Freestyle

50 Backstroke

100 Backstroke

200 Backstroke

50 Breaststroke

100 Breaststroke

200 Breaststroke

50 Butterfly

100 Butterfly

200 Butterfly

100 Individual Medley

200 Individual Medley

400 Individual Medley

References

FINA Swimming World Cup
2004 in swimming
2003 in swimming